Jim Tansey (born 8 August 1953) is an Australian former soccer player who played as a full-back.

Personal life
The son of Everton footballer Jimmy Tansey, Tansey was born in Liverpool, England in 1953. He emigrated to Australia in 1974. He is also the uncle of 2015 Scottish Cup winner, Greg Tansey.

Club career
Tansey began his senior playing career for South Liverpool F.C. After moving to Australia, he played for Slavia Melbourne in the Victorian State League. With the start of the National Soccer League (NSL), Tansey moved to Fitzroy United Alexander. He later played for NSL club Footscray JUST.

International career
Between 1975 and 1981, Tansey played 19 full international matches for the Australia national team.

Honours
Heidelberg United
 1980 Grand Final

Individual
 Argus Medal: 1976
 FFA Football Hall of Fame - Medal of Excellence: 2010

References

External links
 Aussie Footballers Tabain to Tathem 

Living people
1953 births
English emigrants to Australia
Australian soccer players
Footballers from Liverpool
Association football fullbacks
Australia international soccer players
South Liverpool F.C. players
Heidelberg United FC players
Footscray JUST players